Sir Ronald Ferguson Thomson  (26 June 1830 – 15 November 1888) was a British diplomat.

Thomson spent his entire professional life working for the British Foreign Office in Tehran. He was appointed Secretary of Legation (third class) on 7 September 1848 and was promoted on 5 January 1852 to attaché. In 1879 he succeeded his elder brother William Taylour Thomson in the office of Envoy Extraordinary and Ministers Plenipotentiary to Persia. During his tenure, the Sheikh Ubeydullah uprising took place. In June 1879 he was invested as a Knight Commander of the Order of St Michael and St George, later being promoted to Knight Grand Cross. Ronald  Thomson retired in 1887. He was a Fellow of the Royal Geographical Society and was buried in the Crystal Palace District Cemetery.

References

1830 births
1888 deaths
British diplomats
Knights Grand Cross of the Order of St Michael and St George
Companions of the Order of the Bath
Fellows of the Royal Geographical Society